Delmar is a surname of Spanish origin, meaning "of the sea". Notable people with the surname include:

 Eugene Delmar (1841-1909), American chess master
 Ferdinand Moritz Delmar (1781 - 1858), Prussian banking baron
 Viña Delmar (1903–1990), American novelist
 Kenny Delmar (1910–1984), American actor
 Elaine Delmar (1939–), British singer